This is a list of public art in the Worcestershire county of England. This list applies only to works of public art on permanent display in an outdoor public space. For example, this does not include artworks in museums.

Bromsgrove

Droitwich Spa

Droitwich Canal

St Andrew's Square

Victoria Square

Vines Park

Evesham

Kidderminster

Malvern

Redditch

Upton-upon-Severn

Worcester

Foregate Street and High Street

Worcester Cathedral

Other areas

References 

Worcestershire
wor
Public art